The Ministry of Higher Education and Scientific Research (MESRS) is a ministry of the Ivory Coast (Côte d'Ivoire).

See also

 Education in Ivory Coast

References

External links
 Ministry of Higher Education and Scientific Research 

Politics of Ivory Coast
Political organizations based in Ivory Coast
Higher Education and Scientific Research